The 1923–24 NCAA season was the fourth season of official NCAA sponsorship of team and individual national championships for college athletics in the United States, coinciding with the 1923–24 collegiate academic school year.

Swimming and diving were added as a second sport, bringing the total of sponsored sports to two. However, a men's track and field championship was not held in 1924, keeping the number of championships at one.

Before the introduction of the separate University Division and College Division before the 1955–56 school year, the NCAA only conduced a single national championship for each sport. Women's sports were not added until 1981–82.

Championships

Season results

Team titles, by university
No official team titles awarded this season

Cumulative results

Team titles, by university

References

1923 in American sports
1924 in American sports